Otto Froitzheim won the "over 40" seniors' championships.

Tournament

References

French Championships - Seniors Over 40 Singles
French Championships (tennis) by year
1930 in French tennis